Ancient TL  is a peer-reviewed open-access scientific journal covering luminescence and electron spin resonance dating. It is published by the Luminescence Dosimetry Laboratory, Department of Physics, East Carolina University. The journal was established in 1977 by D.W. Zimmerman (Washington University in St. Louis).

Since 2015 the journal has been available online only. The journal is community maintained and articles can be published and downloaded free of charge. Since 2020, articles are published under the Creative Commons licence CC BY 4.0.

Editors and publishing institutes

External links 
 

English-language journals
Biannual journals